The Belye Medvedi are a Russian ice hockey team in the Junior Hockey League (MHL). They play in Chelyabinsk, Russia at the Traktor Ice Arena. The team was founded in 2009 and is a junior affiliate of the Kontinental Hockey League's Traktor Chelyabinsk and Chelmet Chelyabinsk of the Supreme Hockey League (VHL).

NHL alumni
Evgeny Kuznetsov
Nikita Nesterov
Valeri Nichushkin
Yakov Trenin

External links 
Official website 
Belye Medvedi on engmhl.khl.ru

2009 establishments in Russia
Ice hockey clubs established in 2009
Ice hockey teams in Russia
Junior Hockey League (Russia) teams
Traktor Chelyabinsk